Henry Mildmay (c. 1593–1664) was one of the regicides of Charles I.

Henry Mildmay may also refer to:

Henry Mildmay (of Graces) (1619–1692), English MP for Essex and Maldon
Sir Henry Mildmay, 6th Baronet (1853–1916), English cricketer
Henry St John-Mildmay (disambiguation)

See also
Mildmay (disambiguation)